The 2002 AFL season was the 106th season of the Australian Football League (AFL), the highest level senior Australian rules football competition in Australia, which was known as the Victorian Football League until 1989. The season featured sixteen clubs, ran from 28 March until 28 September, and comprised a 22-game home-and-away season followed by a finals series featuring the top eight clubs.

The premiership was won by the Brisbane Lions for the second time and second time consecutively, after it defeated  by nine points in the AFL Grand Final.

AFL Draft
See 2002 AFL Draft.

Wizard Home Loans Cup

Port Adelaide defeated Richmond 10.11 (71) to 9.8 (62) in the final.

Premiership season

Round 1

Round 2

Round 3

Round 4

Round 5

Round 6

|- bgcolor="#CCCCFF"
| Home team
| Score
| Away team
| Score
| Venue
| Attendance
| Date
|- bgcolor="#FFFFFF"
| 
| 3.10 (28)
| 
| 16.15 (111)
| Colonial Stadium
| 46,089
| Friday, 3 May
|- bgcolor="#FFFFFF"
| 
| 13.11 (89)
| 
| 9.8 (62)
| Subiaco Oval
| 25,319
| Saturday, 4 May
|- bgcolor="#FFFFFF"
| 
| 13.9 (87)
| 
| 24.11 (155)
| MCG
| 33,345
| Saturday, 4 May
|- bgcolor="#FFFFFF"
| 
| 9.14 (68)
| 
| 14.12 (96)
| Colonial Stadium
| 29,783
| Saturday, 4 May
|- bgcolor="#FFFFFF"
| 
| 21.20 (146)
| 
| 13.11 (89)
| The Gabba
| 27,015
| Saturday, 4 May
|- bgcolor="#FFFFFF"
| 
| 15.9 (99)
| 
| 10.11 (71)
| SCG
| 23,578
| Sunday, 5 May
|- bgcolor="#FFFFFF"
| 
| 20.13 (133)
| 
| 11.13 (79)
| Football Park
| 27,056
| Sunday, 5 May
|- bgcolor="#FFFFFF"
| 
| 11.7 (73)
| 
| 14.21 (105)
| Colonial Stadium
| 23,355
| Sunday, 5 May

Round 7

|- bgcolor="#CCCCFF"
| Home team
| Score
| Away team
| Score
| Venue
| Attendance
| Date
|- bgcolor="#FFFFFF"
| 
| 12.15 (87)
| 
| 9.8 (62)
| MCG
| 55,633
| Friday, 10 May
|- bgcolor="#FFFFFF"
| 
| 21.13 (139)
| 
| 13.12 (90)
| Subiaco Oval
| 32,815
| Saturday, 11 May
|- bgcolor="#FFFFFF"
| 
| 20.10 (130)
| 
| 11.12 (78)
| MCG
| 38,709
| Saturday, 11 May
|- bgcolor="#FFFFFF"
| 
| 13.10 (88)
| 
| 12.10 (82)
| Colonial Stadium
| 29,303
| Saturday, 11 May
|- bgcolor="#FFFFFF"
| 
| 18.10 (118)
| 
| 13.11 (89)
| Football Park
| 44,058
| Saturday, 11 May
|- bgcolor="#FFFFFF"
| 
| 19.15 (129)
| 
| 11.6 (72)
| The Gabba
| 24,538
| Sunday, 12 May
|- bgcolor="#FFFFFF"
| 
| 15.15 (105)
| 
| 15.12 (102)
| MCG
| 20,892
| Sunday, 12 May
|- bgcolor="#FFFFFF"
| 
| 8.15 (63)
| 
| 11.7 (73)
| Colonial Stadium
| 34,400
| Sunday, 12 May

Round 8

|- bgcolor="#CCCCFF"
| Home team
| Score
| Away team
| Score
| Venue
| Attendance
| Date
|- bgcolor="#FFFFFF"
| 
| 12.17 (89)
| 
| 12.8 (80)
| MCG
| 39,142
| Friday, 17 May
|- bgcolor="#FFFFFF"
| 
| 13.16 (94)
| 
| 10.13 (73)
| MCG
| 22,647
| Saturday, 18 May
|- bgcolor="#FFFFFF"
| 
| 20.9 (129)
| 
| 7.12 (54)
| Football Park
| 18,193
| Saturday, 18 May
|- bgcolor="#FFFFFF"
| 
| 14.10 (94)
| 
| 13.11 (89)
| Subiaco Oval
| 25,027
| Saturday, 18 May
|- bgcolor="#FFFFFF"
| 
| 17.12 (114)
| 
| 16.15 (111)
| Colonial Stadium
| 46,279
| Saturday, 18 May
|- bgcolor="#FFFFFF"
| 
| 16.14 (110)
| 
| 14.9 (93)
| Manuka Oval
| 7,671
| Sunday, 19 May
|- bgcolor="#FFFFFF"
| 
| 24.15 (159)
| 
| 11.24 (90)
| SCG
| 20,934
| Sunday, 19 May
|- bgcolor="#FFFFFF"
| 
| 26.15 (171)
| 
| 11.6 (72)
| Colonial Stadium
| 34,262
| Sunday, 19 May

Round 9

|- bgcolor="#CCCCFF"
| Home team
| Score
| Away team
| Score
| Venue
| Attendance
| Date
|- bgcolor="#FFFFFF"
| 
| 14.7 (91)
| 
| 12.14 (86)
| Football Park
| 35,834
| Friday, 24 May
|- bgcolor="#FFFFFF"
| 
| 17.3 (105)
| 
| 18.9 (117)
| Skilled Stadium
| 22,033
| Saturday, 25 May
|- bgcolor="#FFFFFF"
| 
| 17.9 (111)
| 
| 15.17 (107)
| MCG
| 28,625
| Saturday, 25 May
|- bgcolor="#FFFFFF"
| 
| 10.12 (72)
| 
| 9.9 (63)
| Colonial Stadium
| 30,336
| Saturday, 25 May
|- bgcolor="#FFFFFF"
| 
| 11.17 (83)
| 
| 12.13 (85)
| Stadium Australia
| 54,129
| Saturday, 25 May
|- bgcolor="#FFFFFF"
| 
| 16.13 (109)
| 
| 11.13 (79)
| The Gabba
| 21,709
| Sunday, 26 May
|- bgcolor="#FFFFFF"
| 
| 19.12 (126)
| 
| 14.4 (88)
| Subiaco Oval
| 38,646
| Sunday, 26 May
|- bgcolor="#FFFFFF"
| 
| 11.9 (75)
| 
| 20.11 (131)
| Optus Oval
| 19,305
| Sunday, 26 May

Round 10

|- bgcolor="#CCCCFF"
| Home team
| Score
| Away team
| Score
| Venue
| Attendance
| Date
|- bgcolor="#FFFFFF"
| 
| 12.20 (92)
| 
| 12.12 (84)
| MCG
| 34,352
| Friday, 31 May
|- bgcolor="#FFFFFF"
| 
| 12.17 (89)
| 
| 9.9 (63)
| Skilled Stadium
| 20,031
| Saturday, 1 June
|- bgcolor="#FFFFFF"
| 
| 14.14 (98)
| 
| 17.15 (117)
| MCG
| 31,586
| Saturday, 1 June
|- bgcolor="#FFFFFF"
| 
| 14.11 (95)
| 
| 12.12 (84)
| Colonial Stadium
| 45,269
| Saturday, 1 June
|- bgcolor="#FFFFFF"
| 
| 15.11 (101)
| 
| 14.10 (94)
| Football Park
| 47,279
| Saturday, 1 June
|- bgcolor="#FFFFFF"
| 
| 12.5 (77)
| 
| 17.15 (117)
| York Park
| 18,112
| Sunday, 2 June
|- bgcolor="#FFFFFF"
| 
| 14.12 (96)
| 
| 10.8 (68)
| Subiaco Oval
| 27,277
| Sunday, 2 June
|- bgcolor="#FFFFFF"
| 
| 20.7 (127)
| 
| 11.11 (77)
| Colonial Stadium
| 18,876
| Sunday, 2 June

Round 11

|- bgcolor="#CCCCFF"
| Home team
| Score
| Away team
| Score
| Venue
| Attendance
| Date
|- bgcolor="#FFFFFF"
| 
| 14.11 (95)
| 
| 11.18 (84)
| Colonial Stadium
| 30,889
| Friday, 7 June
|- bgcolor="#FFFFFF"
| 
| 14.18 (102)
| 
| 8.10 (58)
| Football Park
| 42,162
| Saturday, 8 June
|- bgcolor="#FFFFFF"
| 
| 15.12 (102)
| 
| 13.11 (89)
| Subiaco Oval
| 35,014
| Saturday, 8 June
|- bgcolor="#FFFFFF"
| 
| 7.7 (49)
| 
| 16.12 (108)
| Colonial Stadium
| 40,044
| Saturday, 8 June
|- bgcolor="#FFFFFF"
| 
| 16.17 (113)
| 
| 7.10 (52)
| The Gabba
| 23,157
| Sunday, 9 June
|- bgcolor="#FFFFFF"
| 
| 15.10 (100)
| 
| 14.12 (96)
| Colonial Stadium
| 37,294
| Sunday, 9 June
|- bgcolor="#FFFFFF"
| 
| 22.13 (145)
| 
| 12.8 (80)
| Optus Oval
| 11,539
| Sunday, 9 June
|- bgcolor="#FFFFFF"
| 
| 10.15 (75)
| 
| 19.12 (126)
| MCG
| 65,860
| Monday, 10 June

Round 12

|- bgcolor="#CCCCFF"
| Home team
| Score
| Away team
| Score
| Venue
| Attendance
| Date
|- bgcolor="#FFFFFF"
| 
| 10.12 (72)
| 
| 10.5 (65)
| MCG
| 40,470
| Friday, 14 June
|- bgcolor="#FFFFFF"
| 
| 12.16 (88)
| 
| 12.17 (89)
| Optus Oval
| 16,353
| Saturday, 15 June
|- bgcolor="#FFFFFF"
| 
| 15.9 (99)
| 
| 15.11 (101)
| SCG
| 21,767
| Saturday, 15 June
|- bgcolor="#FFFFFF"
| 
| 12.18 (90)
| 
| 12.7 (79)
| Subiaco Oval
| 33,088
| Sunday, 16 June
|- bgcolor="#FFFFFF"
| 
| 19.19 (133)
| 
| 13.8 (86)
| Colonial Stadium
| 29,453
| Friday, 21 June
|- bgcolor="#FFFFFF"
| 
| 14.14 (98)
| 
| 10.13 (73)
| Optus Oval
| 12,210
| Saturday, 22 June
|- bgcolor="#FFFFFF"
| 
| 20.18 (138)
| 
| 19.9 (123)
| The Gabba
| 27,940
| Saturday, 22 June
|- bgcolor="#FFFFFF"
| 
| 23.16 (154)
| 
| 10.10 (70)
| Football Park
| 25,770
| Sunday, 23 June

Round 13

|- bgcolor="#CCCCFF"
| Home team
| Score
| Away team
| Score
| Venue
| Attendance
| Date
|- bgcolor="#FFFFFF"
| 
| 18.12 (120)
| 
| 16.12 (108)
| Colonial Stadium
| 41,817
| Friday, 28 June
|- bgcolor="#FFFFFF"
| 
| 7.12 (54)
| 
| 14.12 (96)
| MCG
| 30,197
| Saturday, 29 June
|- bgcolor="#FFFFFF"
| 
| 25.11 (161)
| 
| 18.7 (115)
| Football Park
| 24,751
| Saturday, 29 June
|- bgcolor="#FFFFFF"
| 
| 13.15 (93)
| 
| 8.12 (60)
| Colonial Stadium
| 48,288
| Saturday, 29 June
|- bgcolor="#FFFFFF"
| 
| 19.10 (124)
| 
| 16.13 (109)
| The Gabba
| 27,324
| Saturday, 29 June
|- bgcolor="#FFFFFF"
| 
| 20.19 (139)
| 
| 9.8 (62)
| SCG
| 16,844
| Sunday, 30 June
|- bgcolor="#FFFFFF"
| 
| 20.15 (135)
| 
| 18.9 (117)
| Subiaco Oval
| 34,937
| Sunday, 30 June
|- bgcolor="#FFFFFF"
| 
| 11.12 (78)
| 
| 13.9 (87)
| Colonial Stadium
| 28,928
| Sunday, 30 June

Round 14

|- bgcolor="#CCCCFF"
| Home team
| Score
| Away team
| Score
| Venue
| Attendance
| Date
|- bgcolor="#FFFFFF"
| 
| 13.8 (86)
| 
| 12.13 (85)
| MCG
| 36,941
| Friday, 5 July
|- bgcolor="#FFFFFF"
| 
| 8.17 (65)
| 
| 4.9 (33)
| Skilled Stadium
| 18,608
| Saturday, 6 July
|- bgcolor="#FFFFFF"
| 
| 11.8 (74)
| 
| 9.10 (64)
| MCG
| 25,079
| Saturday, 6 July
|- bgcolor="#FFFFFF"
| 
| 9.9 (63)
| 
| 22.15 (147)
| Subiaco Oval
| 24,193
| Saturday, 6 July
|- bgcolor="#FFFFFF"
| 
| 18.10 (118)
| 
| 17.16 (118)
| Colonial Stadium
| 44,864
| Saturday, 6 July
|- bgcolor="#FFFFFF"
| 
| 20.11 (131)
| 
| 16.14 (110)
| The Gabba
| 25,166
| Sunday, 7 July
|- bgcolor="#FFFFFF"
| 
| 17.14 (116)
| 
| 21.12 (138)
| Football Park
| 46,368
| Sunday, 7 July
|- bgcolor="#FFFFFF"
| 
| 13.6 (84)
| 
| 20.8 (128)
| Colonial Stadium
| 23,864
| Sunday, 7 July

Round 15

|- bgcolor="#CCCCFF"
| Home team
| Score
| Away team
| Score
| Venue
| Attendance
| Date
|- bgcolor="#FFFFFF"
| 
| 17.14 (116)
| 
| 14.9 (93)
| Colonial Stadium
| 35,434
| Friday, 12 July
|- bgcolor="#FFFFFF"
| 
| 12.11 (83)
| 
| 12.10 (82)
| Manuka Oval
| 9,242
| Saturday, 13 July
|- bgcolor="#FFFFFF"
| 
| 15.9 (99)
| 
| 19.13 (127)
| MCG
| 65,331
| Saturday, 13 July
|- bgcolor="#FFFFFF"
| 
| 7.13 (55)
| 
| 18.10 (118)
| Colonial Stadium
| 22,642
| Saturday, 13 July
|- bgcolor="#FFFFFF"
| 
| 15.9 (99)
| 
| 12.9 (81)
| Football Park
| 29,895
| Saturday, 13 July
|- bgcolor="#FFFFFF"
| 
| 13.14 (92)
| 
| 14.10 (94)
| SCG
| 18,974
| Sunday, 14 July
|- bgcolor="#FFFFFF"
| 
| 13.12 (90)
| 
| 8.15 (63)
| Subiaco Oval
| 37,600
| Sunday, 14 July
|- bgcolor="#FFFFFF"
| 
| 14.11 (95)
| 
| 21.13 (139)
| Colonial Stadium
| 37,915
| Sunday, 14 July

Round 16

|- bgcolor="#CCCCFF"
| Home team
| Score
| Away team
| Score
| Venue
| Attendance
| Date
|- bgcolor="#FFFFFF"
| 
| 13.11 (89)
| 
| 7.7 (49)
| MCG
| 48,620
| Friday, 19 July
|- bgcolor="#FFFFFF"
| 
| 9.13 (67)
| 
| 14.9 (93)
| MCG
| 37,442
| Saturday, 20 July
|- bgcolor="#FFFFFF"
| 
| 14.15 (99)
| 
| 10.10 (70)
| Optus Oval
| 9,398
| Saturday, 20 July
|- bgcolor="#FFFFFF"
| 
| 15.10 (100)
| 
| 11.4 (70)
| Subiaco Oval
| 41,779
| Saturday, 20 July
|- bgcolor="#FFFFFF"
| 
| 8.8 (56)
| 
| 14.11 (95)
| Colonial Stadium
| 47,778
| Saturday, 20 July
|- bgcolor="#FFFFFF"
| 
| 17.15 (117)
| 
| 12.7 (79)
| The Gabba
| 25,720
| Sunday, 21 July
|- bgcolor="#FFFFFF"
| 
| 21.12 (138)
| 
| 14.11 (95)
| AAMI Stadium
| 41,247
| Sunday, 21 July
|- bgcolor="#FFFFFF"
| 
| 14.13 (97)
| 
| 22.8 (140)
| Colonial Stadium
| 33,813
| Sunday, 21 July

Round 17

|- bgcolor="#CCCCFF"
| Home team
| Score
| Away team
| Score
| Venue
| Attendance
| Date
|- bgcolor="#FFFFFF"
| 
| 7.11 (53)
| 
| 7.12 (54)
| MCG
| 39,650
| Friday, 26 July
|- bgcolor="#FFFFFF"
| 
| 10.8 (68)
| 
| 18.16 (124)
| MCG
| 35,202
| Saturday, 27 July
|- bgcolor="#FFFFFF"
| 
| 17.12 (114)
| 
| 8.8 (56)
| Subiaco Oval
| 38,877
| Saturday, 27 July
|- bgcolor="#FFFFFF"
| 
| 17.14 (116)
| 
| 17.10 (112)
| AAMI Stadium
| 25,283
| Saturday, 27 July
|- bgcolor="#FFFFFF"
| 
| 13.14 (92)
| 
| 10.9 (69)
| Stadium Australia
| 34,404
| Saturday, 27 July
|- bgcolor="#FFFFFF"
| 
| 12.18 (90)
| 
| 15.3 (93)
| Skilled Stadium
| 24,325
| Sunday, 28 July
|- bgcolor="#FFFFFF"
| 
| 18.10 (118)
| 
| 13.11 (79)
| Optus Oval
| 8,078
| Sunday, 28 July
|- bgcolor="#FFFFFF"
| 
| 21.13 (139)
| 
| 16.9 (105)
| Colonial Stadium
| 31,576
| Sunday, 28 July

Round 18

|- bgcolor="#CCCCFF"
| Home team
| Score
| Away team
| Score
| Venue
| Attendance
| Date
|- bgcolor="#FFFFFF"
| 
| 21.15 (141)
| 
| 4.9 (33)
| MCG
| 54,233
| Friday, 2 August
|- bgcolor="#FFFFFF"
| 
| 7.9 (51)
| 
| 17.13 (115)
| Skilled Stadium
| 23,163
| Saturday, 3 August
|- bgcolor="#FFFFFF"
| 
| 14.12 (96)
| 
| 4.11 (35)
| Subiaco Oval
| 24,332
| Saturday, 3 August
|- bgcolor="#FFFFFF"
| 
| 11.5 (71)
| 
| 16.12 (108)
| Colonial Stadium
| 43,036
| Saturday, 3 August
|- bgcolor="#FFFFFF"
| 
| 16.9 (105)
| 
| 9.9 (63)
| AAMI Stadium
| 22,885
| Saturday, 3 August
|- bgcolor="#FFFFFF"
| 
| 15.8 (98)
| 
| 17.14 (116)
| SCG
| 18,766
| Sunday, 4 August
|- bgcolor="#FFFFFF"
| 
| 14.10 (94)
| 
| 14.15 (99)
| MCG
| 28,815
| Sunday, 4 August
|- bgcolor="#FFFFFF"
| 
| 22.10 (142)
| 
| 14.7 (91)
| Optus Oval
| 11,809
| Sunday, 4 August

Round 19

|- bgcolor="#CCCCFF"
| Home team
| Score
| Away team
| Score
| Venue
| Attendance
| Date
|- bgcolor="#FFFFFF"
| 
| 15.15 (105)
| 
| 14.13 (97)
| MCG
| 53,750
| Friday, 9 August
|- bgcolor="#FFFFFF"
| 
| 5.15 (45)
| 
| 7.12 (54)
| Optus Oval
| 14,115
| Saturday, 10 August
|- bgcolor="#FFFFFF"
| 
| 18.14 (122)
| 
| 10.12 (72)
| MCG
| 19,519
| Saturday, 10 August
|- bgcolor="#FFFFFF"
| 
| 14.21 (105)
| 
| 9.13 (67)
| The Gabba
| 27,443
| Saturday, 10 August
|- bgcolor="#FFFFFF"
| 
| 15.7 (97)
| 
| 22.12 (144)
| SCG
| 14,776
| Saturday, 10 August
|- bgcolor="#FFFFFF"
| 
| 18.16 (124)
| 
| 11.10 (76)
| AAMI Stadium
| 43,720
| Sunday, 11 August
|- bgcolor="#FFFFFF"
| 
| 15.10 (100)
| 
| 15.16 (106)
| Subiaco Oval
| 36,195
| Sunday, 11 August
|- bgcolor="#FFFFFF"
| 
| 15.11 (101)
| 
| 16.6 (102)
| Colonial Stadium
| 25,552
| Sunday, 11 August

Round 20

|- bgcolor="#CCCCFF"
| Home team
| Score
| Away team
| Score
| Venue
| Attendance
| Date
|- bgcolor="#FFFFFF"
| 
| 16.11 (107)
| 
| 13.15 (93)
| MCG
| 39,391
| Friday, 16 August
|- bgcolor="#FFFFFF"
| 
| 17.15 (117)
| 
| 11.6 (72)
| Subiaco Oval
| 22,610
| Saturday, 17 August
|- bgcolor="#FFFFFF"
| 
| 17.12 (114)
| 
| 15.5 (95)
| Colonial Stadium
| 23,532
| Saturday, 17 August
|- bgcolor="#FFFFFF"
| 
| 19.12 (126)
| 
| 10.11 (71)
| MCG
| 69,613
| Saturday, 17 August
|- bgcolor="#FFFFFF"
| 
| 20.16 (136)
| 
| 13.11 (89)
| The Gabba
| 29,436
| Saturday, 17 August
|- bgcolor="#FFFFFF"
| 
| 12.12 (84)
| 
| 11.10 (76)
| AAMI Stadium
| 50,275
| Sunday, 18 August
|- bgcolor="#FFFFFF"
| 
| 12.15 (87)
| 
| 12.8 (80)
| SCG
| 16,079
| Sunday, 18 August
|- bgcolor="#FFFFFF"
| 
| 15.17 (107)
| 
| 14.11 (95)
| MCG
| 29,225
| Sunday, 18 August

Round 21

|- bgcolor="#CCCCFF"
| Home team
| Score
| Away team
| Score
| Venue
| Attendance
| Date
|- bgcolor="#FFFFFF"
| 
| 16.8 (104)
| 
| 17.17 (119)
| MCG
| 32,393
| Friday, 23 August
|- bgcolor="#FFFFFF"
| 
| 7.13 (55)
| 
| 16.14 (110)
| Skilled Stadium
| 24,003
| Saturday, 24 August
|- bgcolor="#FFFFFF"
| 
| 11.11 (77)
| 
| 23.7 (145)
| MCG
| 27,146
| Saturday, 24 August
|- bgcolor="#FFFFFF"
| 
| 10.5 (65)
| 
| 14.19 (103)
| Subiaco Oval
| 36,502
| Saturday, 24 August
|- bgcolor="#FFFFFF"
| 
| 14.13 (97)
| 
| 15.9 (99)
| Colonial Stadium
| 22,938
| Saturday, 24 August
|- bgcolor="#FFFFFF"
| 
| 13.9 (87)
| 
| 9.11 (65)
| AAMI Stadium
| 42,878
| Sunday, 25 August
|- bgcolor="#FFFFFF"
| 
| 11.11 (77)
| 
| 9.12 (66)
| MCG
| 42,056
| Sunday, 25 August
|- bgcolor="#FFFFFF"
| 
| 13.15 (93)
| 
| 10.12 (72)
| Colonial Stadium
| 32,667
| Sunday, 25 August

Round 22

|- bgcolor="#CCCCFF"
| Home team
| Score
| Away team
| Score
| Venue
| Attendance
| Date
|- bgcolor="#FFFFFF"
| 
| 8.9 (57)
| 
| 11.9 (75)
| Colonial Stadium
| 41,600
| Friday, 30 August
|- bgcolor="#FFFFFF"
| 
| 10.13 (73)
| 
| 17.12 (114)
| MCG
| 43,894
| Saturday, 31 August
|- bgcolor="#FFFFFF"
| 
| 13.12 (90)
| 
| 13.6 (84)
| AAMI Stadium
| 46,439
| Saturday, 31 August
|- bgcolor="#FFFFFF"
| 
| 18.9 (117)
| 
| 20.15 (135)
| Colonial Stadium
| 34,185
| Saturday, 31 August
|- bgcolor="#FFFFFF"
| 
| 17.14 (116)
| 
| 11.10 (76)
| Telstra Stadium
| 40,386
| Saturday, 31 August
|- bgcolor="#FFFFFF"
| 
| 18.18 (126)
| 
| 22.11 (143)
| Manuka Oval
| 11,613
| Sunday, 1 September
|- bgcolor="#FFFFFF"
| 
| 12.8 (80)
| 
| 17.18 (120)
| Subiaco Oval
| 21,610
| Sunday, 1 September
|- bgcolor="#FFFFFF"
| 
| 5.7 (37)
| 
| 12.20 (92)
| MCG
| 46,649
| Sunday, 1 September

Ladder
All teams played 22 games during the home and away season, for a total of 176. An additional 9 games were played during the finals series.

Ladder progression

Finals series

Week one

|- bgcolor="#CCCCFF"
| Home team
| Score
| Away team
| Score
| Venue
| Attendance
| Date
|- bgcolor="#FFFFFF"
| 
| 14.11 (95)
| 
| 16.12 (108)
| AAMI Stadium
| 33,131
| Friday, 6 September
|- bgcolor="#FFFFFF"
| 
| 17.9 (111)
| 
| 11.12 (78)
| Colonial Stadium
| 37,475
| Saturday, 7 September
|- bgcolor="#FFFFFF"
| 
| 17.13 (115)
| 
| 5.14 (44)
| The Gabba
| 31,854
| Saturday, 7 September
|- bgcolor="#FFFFFF"
| 
| 18.14 (122)
| 
| 11.18 (84)
| MCG
| 53,967
| Sunday, 8 September

Week two

|- bgcolor="#CCCCFF"
| Home Team
| Score| Away team| Score| Venue| Attendance| Date|- bgcolor="#FFFFFF"
| | 11.17 (83)| 
| 8.11 (59)
| AAMI Stadium
| 27,661
| Friday, 13 September
|- bgcolor="#FFFFFF"
| | 20.10 (130)| 
| 17.16 (118)
| MCG
| 51,533
| Saturday, 14 September

Note: Adelaide played its "home" final at the MCG despite being ranked above Melbourne due to the agreement then in place with the Melbourne Cricket Club that at least one game each week of the finals be played at the MCG.

Week three

|- bgcolor="#CCCCFF"
| Home team| Score| Away team| Score| Venue| Attendance| Date|- bgcolor="#FFFFFF"
| | 13.13 (91)| 
| 9.9 (63)
| MCG
| 88,960
| Saturday, 21 September
|- bgcolor="#FFFFFF"
| | 21.12 (138)| 
| 12.10 (82)
| The Gabba
| 33,047
| Saturday, 21 September

Week four

|- bgcolor="#CCCCFF"
| Home team 
| Score| Away team| Score| Venue| Attendance| Date|- bgcolor="#FFFFFF"
| 
| 9.12 (66)
| | 10.15 (75) '''
| MCG
| 91,817
| Saturday, 28 September

Match attendance
Total match attendance for all games was 5,643,908 people. Attendance at the Grand Final was 91,817 people. The largest non-finals attendance was 84,894 people for the Collingwood v Essendon game in round 5.

Awards
 The Brownlow Medal was awarded to Simon Black of the Brisbane Lions.
 The Leigh Matthews Trophy was awarded to Luke Darcy of the Western Bulldogs and Michael Voss of the Brisbane Lions.
 This was the first year for this award under this name. Previously, it was the AFL Players Association MVP Award.
 The Coleman Medal was awarded to David Neitz of Melbourne.
 The Norm Smith Medal was awarded to Nathan Buckley of Collingwood.
 The AFL Rising Star award was awarded to Nick Riewoldt of St Kilda.

Notable events
 For the first time since 1965, no player kicked ten goals or more in a match.
  would appear in the finals for the first time since 1994, breaking an eight year drought, the longest in club history. They would also win their first final in twelve years since their last premiership in 1990, also the longest drought of finals wins in club history.
  won the wooden spoon for the first time. Carlton was the last of the twelve traditional Victorian clubs to win the wooden spoon in the VFL/AFL.
 played only four home games at Optus Oval, after arranging a deal to play four home games at Colonial Stadium. In order for the AFL to meet its contractual obligation to stage nine games per year at Optus Oval, six neutral games between a low-drawing Victorian team and an interstate team were staged at the venue. The unpopular venture was not repeated, as all of the home teams in these neutral games lost money due to poor crowds and, in many cases, conflicting sponsorship deals.
Even though Adelaide was entitled to a home Semi-Final after losing its Qualifying Final to Brisbane, the game was played at the Melbourne Cricket Ground due to a licence agreement which required at least one game to be played at the ground during each week of the finals.
 At the end of the season, the Carlton Football Club was found to have systematically breached the salary cap in 2000 and 2001. The club was fined and stripped of draft picks in the following two drafts, hampering their on-field results and long-term playing list rebuild in subsequent seasons.
 Sydney coach Rodney Eade resigned following round 12, after the Swans slumped to 14th on the ladder. He was eventually replaced by Paul Roos on a full-time basis, despite the board pushing for Terry Wallace, who resigned as coach of the Western Bulldogs with one round to play in the regular season, to be appointed. Roos would later coach the side to the premiership in 2005 before stepping down at the end of the 2010 season.

References

 2002 Season – AFL Tables

AFL season
2002